Theodore Roosevelt High School, usually referred to simply as Roosevelt High School or TRHS, is a public secondary school located on the west side of Des Moines, Iowa. It is one of five secondary schools in the Des Moines Independent Community School District, and was named after the 26th President of the United States, Theodore Roosevelt.

History
The construction of the building in which TRHS is housed was initiated in 1922 by Proudfoot, Bird, and Rawson and opened in 1924 with 1,282 students.  The final cost to build was $1,331,600.  The building's design has won many awards and is considered one of 50 most significant buildings in Iowa by PBS. The building is on both the State and National Register of Historic Places.

Curriculum

Students must be enrolled in physical education at least one semester each year and complete CPR certification. They are also required to take core academic courses in order to graduate and receive a diploma. These include Social Studies, English, Mathematics, Science, and Art.

Visual and Performing Arts 
Roosevelt offers a range of visual and performing arts programming, including 2D & 3D design, painting and drawing, band, orchestra, theater, choir, and AP music theory.

Bands 

 Marching Band
 Jazz Band I
 Jazz Band II
 Symphonic Band (beginning)
 Wind Ensemble (advanced)
 Wind Symphony (intermediate)

Orchestras 

 Orchestra (beginning-intermediate)
 Honors Orchestra/Chamber Orchestra (advanced)

Vocal Music Choirs 

 Bridges 2 Harmony Gospel Choir
 Chamber Choir
 Da capo Vocal Jazz
 Forte Treble Choir
 Revelation Varsity Show Choir
 Rider Rhythm Junior Varsity Show Choir
 Riderchor Bass Clef Choir

Athletics and activities

Roosevelt competes as a school in the Iowa High School Athletic Association 4A school. The Roughriders are members of the Central Iowa Metro League, and participate in the following sports:
Fall
 Football
 Volleyball
 Cross Country
 Boys' 3-time State Champions (2001, 2002, 2003)
 Boys' golf
 16-time State Champions (1929, 1930, 1931, 1932, 1933, 1934, 1936, 1938, 1939, 1940, 1940(F), 1941, 1941(F), 1946, 1947, 1967)
 Girls' swimming
 4-time State Champions (1966, 1972, 1973, 1980)
Winter 
 Basketball
 Boys' 3-time State Champions (1932, 1965, 1978)
 Girls' 2006 Class 4A State Champions 
 Bowling
 Wrestling
 Boys' swimming
 12-time State Champions (1939, 1940, 1943, 1944, 1945, 1948, 1950, 1951, 1952, 1953, 1959, 1963)
 Spring —
 Track and field
 Boys' 2-time state Champions (1946, 1999)
 Soccer
 Tennis
 Boys' 3-time State Champions (2000, 2002, 2009)
 Girls' golf
 Summer 
 Baseball
 Softball

Notable alumni

 Inez Asher, novelist and television writer
 Bill Bryson, best-selling author; inducted in school's Hall of Fame in 2001
 Randy Duncan, runner-up for Heisman Trophy, first pick of 1959 NFL Draft
 Larry Ely, NFL player
 Ann B. Friedman, founder of Planet Word, a museum of language arts
 Everett Gendler, (Class of 1946) rabbi known as the "father of Jewish environmentalism"
  Hoot Gibson, former professional basketball player
 Nate Green, MVP Missouri Valley Conference (2000), former Professional basketball player
 John P. Hayes, artist
 David Anthony Higgins, actor and comedy writer
 Young Fyre, record producer
 Steve Higgins, announcer, The Tonight Show with Jimmy Fallon
 Lolo Jones (Class of 2000), Summer and Winter Olympian, track-and-field and bobsled athlete
 Natasha Kaiser-Brown, sprinter, Olympic silver medalist and relay world champion
 Cloris Leachman, Emmy and Academy Award-winning actress; 1987 Roosevelt Hall of Fame inductee
Patricia Schroeder, member of US House of Representatives; class of 1958
 Jane Skiles O'Dea, naval aviator, flight instructor and commander; TRHS Hall of Fame
 Paul Schell, architect, commissioner, Dean of University of Washington College of Architecture and Urban Planning, former mayor of Seattle, Washington (1998–2002)
 Bill Stewart (musician), jazz drummer
 Ben Silbermann (Class of 1999), co-founder of Pinterest
 Olan Soule, 1928 graduate, character actor with hundreds of credits in films, radio, TV and commercials
 Robert D. Ray, Governor of Iowa 1969-83
 George W. Webber (1920–2010), President of New York Theological Seminary.
 Feng Zhang (Class of 2000), Broad Institute and MIT neurobiologist, co-inventor of optogenetics, developer of the CRISPR/Cas9 gene editing method, winner of the Perl-UNC Neuroscience Prize

See also
 Des Moines Independent Community School District for other schools in the same district.
 List of high schools in Iowa

References

External links

 Des Moines Public Schools Homepage
 Roosevelt High School Homepage
 TRHS Alumni Homepage

Roosevelt
Roosevelt
School buildings on the National Register of Historic Places in Iowa
Educational institutions established in 1923
National Register of Historic Places in Des Moines, Iowa
Iowa High School Athletic Association
1923 establishments in Iowa